, also known as  in the Kojiki, and  or  in the Nihon Shoki was the tenth Emperor of Japan. While Sujin is the first emperor whose existence historians widely accept, he is still referred to as a "legendary emperor" due to a lack of information available and because dates for his reign vary. Both the Kojiki, and the Nihon Shoki (collectively known as the Kiki) record events that took place during Sujin's alleged lifetime. This legendary narrative tells how he set up a new shrine outside of the Imperial palace to enshrine Amaterasu. He is also credited with initiating the worship of Ōmononushi (equated with the deity of Mount Miwa), and expanding his empire by sending generals to four regions of Japan in what became known as the legend of Shidō shogun.

This Emperor's reign is conventionally assigned the years of 97 BC – 30 BC. During his alleged lifetime, he fathered twelve children with a chief wife (empress) and two consorts. Sujin chose his future heir based on dreams two of his sons had; in this case, his younger son became Emperor Suinin upon Sujin's death in 30 BC. Like other emperors of this period, the location of Sujin's grave if it exists is unknown. He is traditionally venerated at the Andonyama kofun in Tenri, Nara.

Legendary narrative
The Japanese have traditionally accepted this sovereign's historical existence, and a kofun (tumulus) for Sujin is currently maintained. There remains no conclusive evidence though that supports this historical figure actually reigning. These chronicles include legends and myths, as well as potential historical facts that have since been exaggerated and/or distorted over time. The records state that Sujin was born sometime in 148 BC, and was the second son of Emperor Kaika. Sujin's mother was Ikagashikome no Mikoto, who was also a concubine of Sujin's grandfather Emperor Kōgen. Before he was enthroned sometime in 97 BC, his pre-ascension name was either Prince Mimakiirihikoinie no Mikoto, Mimakiiribikoinie no Sumeramikoto, or Hatsukunishirasu Sumeramikoto. The former name is used in the Kojiki, while the latter two are found in the Nihon Shoki.

Enshrining Ōmononushi (Miwa Myōjin)

The Kiki records that pestilence struck during the 5th year of Sujin's rule, killing half the Japanese population. The following year peasants abandoned their fields and rebellion became rampant. To help relieve the suffering of his people, the Emperor turned his attention towards the gods. At the time, both the sun goddess Amaterasu and the god  were enshrined at the Imperial Residence. Sujin became overwhelmed with having to cohabit with these two powerful deities and set up separate enshrinements to house them. Sujin placed his daughter  in charge of the new shrine. Yamato-ōkunitama (the other god) was entrusted to another daughter named , but her health began to fail shortly afterward. It is recorded that Nunakiiri-hime became emaciated after losing all of her hair, which rendered her unable to perform her duties. These events still did not alleviate the ongoing plague sweeping the empire, so Sujin decreed a divination to be performed sometime during the 7th year of his reign.

Sujin's aunt  (daughter of 7th Emperor Emperor Kōrei) acted as a miko, and was possessed by a god who identified himself as Ōmononushi. This god claimed responsibility for the plague, announcing that it would not stop until he was venerated. Although the Emperor propitiated to the god, the effects were not immediate. Sujin was later given guidance in the form of a dream to seek out a man named  and appoint him as head priest. When he was found and installed, the pestilence eventually subsided, allowing five cereal crops to ripen. To this day the Miwa sept of the Kamo clan claim to be descents from Ōtataneko, while Ikagashikoo was a claimed ancestor of the now extinct Mononobe clan.

Four Cardinal Quarters (Shidō shogun)

In his 10th year of rule, Sujin instituted four of his Generals to the Four Cardinal Quarters in what would be known as the Shidō shogun. These areas (west, north/northwest, northeast, and east) were all centered around the capital in Yamato Province. Sujin instructed his generals (shogun) to quell those who would not submit to their rule. One of the four shoguns who had been sent to the northern region was named , who was also Emperor Kōgen's first son. One day a certain maiden approached Ōhiko and sang him a cryptic song, only to disappear afterwards. Sujin's aunt , who was skilled at clairvoyance, interpreted this to mean that Take-hani-yasu-hiko (Ōhiko's half brother) was plotting an insurrection.

Emperor Sujin gathered his generals in a meeting upon hearing the news, but the couple had already mustered troops to the west who were ready to attack the capital. The Emperor responded by sending an army under the command of general Isaseri-hiko no Mikoto to fight a battle that ended with a decisive Imperial victory. Ata-bime was killed in combat, and her husband fled back north. There was ultimately an exchange of bowshots that resulted in Take-hani-yasu-hiko's death by an arrow through the chest. Eventually the Emperor would appoint 137 governors for the provinces under his Imperial rule as the empire expanded. In his 12th year of rule, the Emperor decreed that a census be taken of the populace "with grades of seniority, and the order of forced labour". The tax system meanwhile was set up so taxes imposed were in the form of mandatory labor. During this period peace and prosperity ensued, and the Emperor received the title .

Choosing an heir and Divine treasures
During the 48th year of Sujin's reign (50 BC), he summoned two of his sons saying that he loved them equally and could not make up his mind which to make his heir. He then asked his sons to describe the dreams they had recently, so he could divine their lot by interpreting them. While facing east, he said that he thrust his spear eight times and then waved his sword eight times skywards. The younger prince, whose name was  dreamt of climbing Mimoro and spanning ropes on four sides. He went on to say how he chased the sparrows that ate the millet. Sujin accordingly chose his younger son Ikume to become the next Crown prince, while his older son Toyoki was chosen to govern the east. Toyoki ultimately became the ancestor of the Kamitsuke and Shimotsuke clans.

Furune's younger brother , accommodated the Imperial Edict on his behalf by sending his two younger brothers as carriers of these treasures to show the Emperor. When Furune returned, he was furious at Iiirine for parting with the treasures. He invited his younger brother to wade in a pool (named Yamuya) with him, where he used a sword-swapping intrigue. Furune exchanged his own wooden sword with his brother's real sword and commenced a battle which ended with Iiirine's death. When the Imperial court received news of the event, they dispatched two generals to slay Izumo Furune.

Later reign and death
Towards the end of his reign in (36 BC), both the Kojiki and Nihon Shoki records indicate that Sujin started to encourage the building of artificial ponds and canals. During this time,  was built near  in Sumiyoshi-ku, Osaka. Sujin is also credited with building  which was said to be located in Karu (Kashihara, Nara). During his alleged lifetime, Sujin fathered twelve children with a chief wife (empress) and two consorts. When he died in 30 BC, his son Prince Ikumeirihikoisachi became the next emperor per Sujin's choice. Sujin's actual burial site is unknown, but is said to be at Mount Miwa.

Historical figure

While Emperor Sujin is the first emperor whom historians state might have actually existed, he is not confirmed as an actual historical figure. Like his predecessors, his reign is disputed due to insufficient material available for further verification and study. Sujin's possible lifespan has been suggested to be as early as the 1st century AD, to as late as the fourth century AD, this is well past his conventionally assigned reign of 97 BC – 30 BC. Like Emperor Kōshō, Emperor Kōrei, and Emperor Kaika, historian Louis Frédéric notes an idea in his book Japan Encyclopedia that Sujin could have lived in the 1st century (AD). This remains  disputed though, especially among researchers who have been critical of his book. If Sujin did in fact exist, then he may have been the founder of the Yamato dynasty. Historian Richard Ponsonby-Fane suggests that Sujin may have been the first emperor to perform a census and establish and regularize a system of taxation.

In either case (fictional or not), the name Sujin-tennō was assigned to him posthumously by later generations. His name might have been regularized centuries after the lifetime ascribed to Sujin, possibly during the time in which legends about the origins of the Yamato dynasty were compiled as the chronicles known today as the Kojiki. Sujin's longevity was also written down by later compilers, who may have unrealistically extended his age to fill in time gaps. While the actual site of Sujin's grave is not known, the Emperor is traditionally venerated at the Andonyama kofun in Tenri, Nara. The Imperial Household Agency designates this location as the kofun (tumulus), and its formal name is ''Yamanobe no michi no Magari no oka no e no misasagi. Sujin's kofun is one of six that are present in the area; the mounds are thought to have built sometime between 250 and 350 AD.

Outside of the Kojiki, the reign of Emperor Kinmei ( – 571 AD) is the first for which contemporary historiography is able to assign verifiable dates. The conventionally accepted names and dates of the early Emperors were not confirmed as "traditional" though, until the reign of Emperor Kanmu between 737 and 806 AD. The lineal ancestor of the current reigning emperor can be traced back to Emperor Kōkaku, who lived a thousand years later.

Consorts and children
Empress: , Prince Ōhiko's daughter
Third Son: , later Emperor Suinin

Consort: , Kii no Arakahatobe's daughter
 ancestor of Keno Clan (毛野君)[
, first Saiō
Consort: , Prince Tatehiroshinabi's daughter
, ancestor of

See also
 Emperor of Japan
 List of Emperors of Japan
 Imperial cult

Notes

References

Further reading

(Nihongi / Nihon Shoki)
→See under Nihon Shoki for fuller bibliography.
, alt-link English translation
 , searchtext resource to retrieve kanbun text vs. English tr. (Aston) in blocs.
, modern Japanese translation.
 sacred texts
, annotated Japanese.

(Secondary sources)
 Brown, Delmer M. and Ichirō Ishida, eds. (1979).  Gukanshō: The Future and the Past. Berkeley: University of California Press. ; 
 Nussbaum, Louis-Frédéric and Käthe Roth. (2005).  Japan encyclopedia. Cambridge: Harvard University Press. ; 
 Ponsonby-Fane, Richard Arthur Brabazon. (1959).  The Imperial House of Japan. Kyoto: Ponsonby Memorial Society. 
 Titsingh, Isaac. (1834). Nihon Ōdai Ichiran; ou,  Annales des empereurs du Japon.  Paris: Royal Asiatic Society, Oriental Translation Fund of Great Britain and Ireland. 
 Varley, H. Paul. (1980).  Jinnō Shōtōki: A Chronicle of Gods and Sovereigns. New York: Columbia University Press. ;

External links
 

 
 

Legendary Emperors of Japan
1st-century BC legendary rulers
1st-century BC Japanese monarchs
People of Yayoi-period Japan